The 2006-07 A1 Grand Prix of Nations, China was an A1 Grand Prix race, held on November 12, 2006 at Beijing International Streetcircuit, Beijing, China. It was the third race in the 2006-07 A1 Grand Prix season and the first and the only meeting held at the circuit.

Due to various safety concerns, the circuit was shortened, and the races started behind the safety car, with the Sprint Race was run mostly behind the safety car. These incidents led to questions about the management and organization of both the event and A1GP in general, eventually leading to series' collapse in 2009. Following the incident and the track's lack of funding, the first Chinese race of the season was moved to Zhuhai International Circuit for the 2007-08 season.

Report

Practice
The first day of practice was canceled because of safety concerns, specifically a very tight hairpin. A revised track layout was devised for extended Saturday practice session.

Qualifying
The field was set by morning practice times, giving The Netherlands' driver Jeroen Bleekemolen pole position for the Sprint race.

Races
The width of the track was also an issue in the Sprint race, as South Africa's Adrian Zaugg spun and stalled his car, blocking half of the track. The safety car was deployed, as a flatbed truck came to remove the stricken vehicle and blocked the entire track, halting the remaining cars.

With more than half the race under the safety car, Jeroen Bleekemolen won the race for The Netherlands, with Salvador Durán of Mexico and A1 Team Italy's Enrico Toccacelo in second and third.

Toccacelo would eventually win the feature race, with Britain's Oliver Jarvis and Australia's Karl Reindler in second and third; the feature race was also marred with crashes and was shortened from 67 scheduled laps to 63 due to time constraints.

Results

Qualification
Qualification was cancelled due to track problems. Accordingly, the grid was set from the times set in the 25 minutes of the morning practice session (Practice 3) before it was red-flagged, under article 144 of the Sporting Regulations.

Sprint Race results
The Sprint Race took place on Sunday, November 12, 2006.

Feature Race results
The Feature Race took place on Sunday, November 12, 2006. The race was initially scheduled for 67 laps, but was shortened by five laps.

Similar problems in China
Similar problems have occurred before in China. The 2004 DTM race around the streets of Pudong in Shanghai was hampered by crashes  due to manhole covers becoming undone; the 2005 Chinese Grand Prix on the Shanghai International Circuit was interrupted when the safety car had to be deployed when a water runoff drain became open. The same problem also occurred in the Australian V8 Supercars race on the same circuit a few months before.

References

Beijing, China
A1 Grand Prix
Auto racing controversies